is  the former head coach of the Takamatsu Five Arrows in the Japanese Bj League.

Head coaching record

|-
| style="text-align:left;"|Takamatsu Five Arrows
| style="text-align:left;"|2006-07
| 40||25||15|||| style="text-align:center;"|3rd|||2||1||1||
| style="text-align:center;"|Runners-up in Bj
|-
| style="text-align:left;"|Takamatsu Five Arrows
| style="text-align:left;"|2007-08
| 44||30||14|||| style="text-align:center;"| 2nd in Western|||1||0||1||
| style="text-align:center;"|Lost in Wild card game
|-
| style="text-align:left;"|Takamatsu Five Arrows
| style="text-align:left;"|2008-09
| 52||33||19|||| style="text-align:center;"| 3rd in Western|||3||1||2||
| style="text-align:center;"|Lost in 1st round
|-
| style="text-align:left;"|Tokyo Apache
| style="text-align:left;"|2009-10
| 52||22||30|||| style="text-align:center;"| 4th in Eastern|||2||0||2||
| style="text-align:center;"|Lost in 1st round
|-
| style="text-align:left;"|Shinshu Brave Warriors
| style="text-align:left;"|2011-12
| 52||18||34|||| style="text-align:center;"| 8th in Eastern|||-||-||-||
| style="text-align:center;"|-
|-
| style="text-align:left;"|Tokyo Cinq Reves
| style="text-align:left;"|2012-13
| 52||18||34|||| style="text-align:center;"| 8th in Eastern|||-||-||-||
| style="text-align:center;"|-
|-
| style="text-align:left;"|Tokyo Cinq Reves
| style="text-align:left;"|2013-14
| 52||13||39|||| style="text-align:center;"| 9th in Eastern|||-||-||-||
| style="text-align:center;"|-
|-
| style="text-align:left;"|Tokyo Cinq Reves
| style="text-align:left;"|2014-15
| 52||5||47|||| style="text-align:center;"| 12th in Eastern|||-||-||-||
| style="text-align:center;"|-
|-

References

1964 births
Living people

Japanese basketball coaches
Kagawa Five Arrows coaches
Shinshu Brave Warriors coaches
Tokyo Apache coaches
Tokyo Cinq Rêves coaches